Denis Kozlov may refer to:
 Denis Kozlov (Belarusian footballer) for PMC Pastavy
 Denis Kozlov, Russian musician known under his artist name In R Voice
 Deniss Kozlovs (born 1983), Latvian judoka